The 2011 Football League Cup Final was the final match of the 2010–11 Football League Cup, the 51st season of the Football League Cup, a football competition for the 92 teams in the Premier League and the Football League. The match was contested by Arsenal and Birmingham City, at Wembley Stadium in London, on 27 February 2011. Birmingham City won the game 2–1 and were guaranteed a spot in the third qualifying round of the 2011–12 UEFA Europa League. Mike Dean was the referee.

Background
Arsenal held the advantage over Birmingham in the league matches between the two sides in 2010–11, having beaten them 2–1 at the Emirates Stadium in October and again 3–0 at St Andrew's on New Year's Day.

Arsenal had played in six Football League Cup finals, but had only won two, most recently in 1993 when they beat Sheffield Wednesday 2–1. Birmingham's only League Cup title came in 1963, when they beat local rivals Aston Villa 3–1 on aggregate after a two-legged final. They also reached the 2001 final, which was played at the Millennium Stadium in Cardiff against Liverpool, but the 2011 final was Birmingham's first appearance in the final of a major competition at Wembley for nearly 55 years, their last being the 1956 FA Cup Final.

Road to Wembley

Pre-match

In the build-up to the game, Arsène Wenger criticised the FA and UEFA for overpricing tickets for their finals. 

A number of Arsenal players missed out on the final. Thomas Vermaelen was not fit, while goalkeeper Łukasz Fabiański had been ruled out for the rest of the season. Theo Walcott picked up a sprained ankle in a match against Stoke City a few days prior, and captain Cesc Fàbregas was also injured in that game; both missed the final. Abou Diaby was also injured.

For Birmingham, Scott Dann was ruled out for the rest of the season following an injury in the League Cup semi-final, while James McFadden was still not recovered from an injury received in September. Former Arsenal player Alexander Hleb was injured in an FA Cup match the week before, and failed to recover in time to play. David Bentley, who had replaced Hleb in that match, was cup-tied, having played for Tottenham Hotspur in their defeat to Arsenal in the third round.

Match

Summary

There was a moment of contention just two minutes into the match as an early Birmingham chance was created through Lee Bowyer, who appeared to be fouled by Arsenal goalkeeper Wojciech Szczęsny in what would probably have been a penalty kick and red card for the keeper. However, Bowyer had already been flagged offside (a decision that replays proved was incorrect).

After ten minutes, Birmingham's Barry Ferguson was involved a collision, and played the rest of the game with what proved to be two broken ribs.

Arsenal threatened regularly throughout the course of the match, with an eventual 20 attempts on goal to Birmingham's 11 (both teams were denied by the woodwork once), however the fine work of Birmingham goalkeeper Ben Foster kept the north London team at bay. Foster would go on to win the man of the match award, and with it, the Alan Hardaker Trophy (also making Foster the first-ever player to win the trophy on two occasions).

Birmingham took the lead in the 28th minute when a corner kick was sent into the box, Roger Johnson won the initial header towards goal which was then flicked in off the head of Nikola Žigić past Wojciech Szczęsny into the net. Arsenal levelled 11 minutes later when, moments after Jack Wilshere struck the crossbar with a shot, Robin van Persie volleyed an Andrei Arshavin cross in with his right foot. However, Van Persie injured himself upon landing, and while he was initially able to continue, he struggled as the match went on and was eventually substituted by Nicklas Bendtner partway through the second half. Going into half-time the scoreline stayed at 1–1, with both teams failing to capitalise on good opportunities to score a second, including Arsenal's Samir Nasri who had a long-range effort saved, and then in the second half Birmingham's Keith Fahey was denied by the post.

On 83 minutes, Birmingham brought on Obafemi Martins in place of Fahey. Six minutes later, and in the final minute of normal time, Martins scored to put Birmingham 2–1 up after a mix-up between Szczęsny and defender Laurent Koscielny. A long ball from Blues keeper Foster, flicked on by Žigić, appeared to be heading safely into the hands of the Arsenal keeper. But Koscielny attempted to play the ball, distracting Szczęsny and causing him to bobble the ball into the path of Martins, who tapped it into an empty net.

Too little time was left for Arsenal to recover, and after four-and-a-half minutes of injury time was seen out, Birmingham City secured their second Football League Cup trophy.

Details

Statistics 

Source: BBC Sport

Notes
A.  Clubs competing in the Premier League, but not in UEFA competitions, receive a bye to the second round.
B.  Clubs competing in UEFA competitions receive a bye to the third round.

References

League Cup Final
Football League Cup Final
2011
League Cup Final 2011
League Cup Final 2011
February 2011 sports events in the United Kingdom